José Salvador Carmona Álvarez (born 22 August 1975) is a Mexican former professional footballer who played as a defender who is currently banned for life from playing professional football affiliated to FIFA for failing two separate anti-doping tests.

During his career, he obtained 84 caps for the Mexico national team since his debut in 1996. He had an important role in the success of the team at two World Cup tournaments: 1998 and 2002.

He was involved in a doping controversy and suspended one year as was teammate Aaron Galindo, in the 2005 FIFA Confederations Cup, therefore prohibiting both players from representing Mexico in the 2006 World Cup. On 16 May 2007, Carmona received a lifetime ban by the Court of Arbitration for Sport for testing positive once again in an antidoping control test taken on 31 January 2006.

Honours
Toluca
Mexican Primera División: Verano 1998, Verano 1999, Verano 2000, Apertura 2002
Campeón de Campeones: 2003
CONCACAF Champions' Cup: 2003

Mexico
CONCACAF Gold Cup: 1998, 2003
FIFA Confederations Cup: 1999

Individual
Mexican Primera División Best full-back: 1998, 2002, 2003

See also
List of sportspeople sanctioned for doping offences

References

External links

Carmona's case Decision rendered by the Court of Arbitration for Sport

1975 births
Living people
Footballers from Mexico City
Association football fullbacks
Mexico international footballers
1997 FIFA Confederations Cup players
1998 CONCACAF Gold Cup players
1998 FIFA World Cup players
1999 Copa América players
1999 FIFA Confederations Cup players
2000 CONCACAF Gold Cup players
2002 FIFA World Cup players
2003 CONCACAF Gold Cup players
2004 Copa América players
CONCACAF Gold Cup-winning players
2005 FIFA Confederations Cup players
FIFA Confederations Cup-winning players
Deportivo Toluca F.C. players
Atlante F.C. footballers
C.D. Guadalajara footballers
Cruz Azul footballers
Liga MX players
Mexican sportspeople in doping cases
Doping cases in association football
Sportspeople banned for life
Mexican footballers